San Nicola Arcella is a town and comune in the province of Cosenza in the Calabria region of southern Italy.

American writer Francis Marion Crawford lived in a coastal tower at San Nicola in the late 19th century.

References

Cities and towns in Calabria